Sadao Watanabe may refer to:

Sadao Watanabe (artist) (1913–1996), Japanese Christian stencil artist
Sadao Watanabe (musician), Japanese jazz saxophonist